Saqlain is a given name and surname. Notable people with the name include:

 Muhammad Saqlain (born 1978), Pakistani field hockey player
 Saqlain Mushtaq (born 1976), Pakistani cricketer
 Saqlain Sajib (born 1988), Bangladeshi cricketer

Pakistani masculine given names